The Mount Vernon News is a print newspaper published twice a week in Mount Vernon, Ohio. It was formed in 1935 through the merger of the Daily Banner and the Republican News. The Culbertson family of Mount Vernon owned and managed The News for eight decades, and Kay Culbertson served as the newspaper's publisher for 28 years from 1992 to 2020.

In August 2020, Metric Media LLC, a newspaper and media company that publishes 1,227 regional and business news sites across the U.S., purchased Mount Vernon News, which was the company's first purchase of an existing print newspaper.

Kyle Barnett, the new publisher, reported in an online "Dear Subscriber" letter two days after the purchase that the Mount Vernon News would immediately transition from its six-day-a-week publication schedule (no Sunday edition) to a two-day-a-week schedule (Wednesday and Saturday). The letter informed readers that "We promise to deliver more local news in 2 days than what you received before in 6 days."

Five months later (in December 2020), Metric Media sold the building on East Vine Street that had been home to The Mount Vernon News for 80 years. The News now operates out of offices in the Woodward Building on South Main Street.

References

External links
Official Site

Newspapers published in Ohio
Knox County, Ohio
1935 establishments in Ohio